A constitutional referendum was held in Kyrgyzstan on 10 February 1996. Voters were asked "Do you approve the law of the Kyrgyz Republic "On amendments and additions of the Constitution of the Kyrgyz Republic," a draft which was published in the Decree of the President of the Kyrgyz Republic on 3 January 1996?"

It was approved by 98.6% of voters, with turnout reported to be 96.6%.

Results

References

1996 in Kyrgyzstan
1996 referendums
Referendums in Kyrgyzstan
Constitutional referendums in Kyrgyzstan